Fanatic is the fifteenth studio album by American/ Canadian rock band Heart, released on October 2, 2012, by Legacy Recordings. The album was recorded in hotel rooms and studios up and down the West Coast, with Grammy Award-winning producer Ben Mink, who had previously produced Red Velvet Car (2010), back at the helm.

Ann and Nancy Wilson drew from their own lives and personal experiences as inspiration for the album. "Dear Old America" comes from memories of a military household and is written from the point of view of their father, a Marine Corps officer, returning from war. "Rock Deep (Vancouver)" hearkens back to the city where Dreamboat Annie was written and "Walkin' Good" (a duet with Vancouver resident Sarah McLachlan) captures the joy of finding new life in a new love.

Fanatic debuted at number 24 on the Billboard 200, selling 16,000 copies in its first week. The album also reached number 12 on Billboard Top Rock Albums chart. The song "Fanatic" peaked at number 24 on Billboard Heritage Rock chart.

Track listing

Personnel
Credits adapted from the liner notes of Fanatic.

Heart
 Nancy Wilson – guitar ; background vocals ; mandolin 
 Ben Mink – guitar, programming ; sonic mangling ; violin ; viola ; keyboards ; banjo, organ ; mandolin ; field holler ; background vocals ; baritone viola ; string arrangements, strings 
 Ric Markmann – bass
 Ben Smith – drums, percussion
 Ann Wilson – vocals ; background vocals ; flute

Additional musicians
 Sarah McLachlan – vocals, background vocals

Technical
 Ben Mink – production
 David Leonard – recording, mixing
 Alex Williams, Geoff Neal, Sam Hofstedt, David Eaman – engineering assistance
 Chris Potter – recording (Sarah McLachlan vocals) 
 Craig Waddell – mastering at Gotham City Studios (Vancouver)

Artwork
 Mike Joyce – art direction, design
 Norman Seeff – photography
 Ann Wilson – sketch
 Carol Peters – sketch
 Ben Mink – photography

Charts

Notes

References

2012 albums
Heart (band) albums
Legacy Recordings albums